The North Slave Region or Tłicho Region is one of five administrative regions in the Northwest Territories of Canada. It is the most populous of the five regions, with a population of almost 23,000. According to Municipal and Community Affairs the region consists of eight communities with the regional office situated in Yellowknife and a sub-office in Behchokǫ̀. With the exception of Yellowknife, the communities are predominantly First Nations.

Communities
The North Slave Region includes the following communities:

Notes

References

External links

North Slave Region at Municipal and Community Affairs